Lora is a female given name and family name in the Spanish language of French origin meaning from Lorraine, a region in Northeastern France.

As a given name, Lora may also be a variant of Laura or derived from an Italian hypocoristic of either Eleonora or Loredana.

People with the given name Lora
Lora (singer) (born 1982), Romanian singer
Lora Aborn (1907-2005), American composer
Lora Aroyo, Dutch computer scientist
Lora Beldon, American artist-curator
Lora L. Corum (1899-1949), American co-winner
Lora Fachie (born 1988), English racing cyclist
Lora Fairclough (born 1970), English professional golfer
Lora Lee Gayer (born 1988), American actress
Lora Grosu (born 1959), Moldovan politician
Lora Hirschberg (born 1963), American sound engineer
Lora Hooper, American biologist
Lora Hubbel, American politician
Lora Johnson, American author
Lora Lazar, Bulgarian crime writer
Lora Leigh (born 1965), American author
Lora Logic (born 1960), British saxophonist
Lora La Mance (born 1857), American writer
Lora Marx (1900-1989), American sculptor
Lora Lee Michel (born 1940), American actress
Lora Ottenad (born 1964), American professional bodybuilder
Lora Petrova (born 1998), Bulgarian footballer
Lora Reinbold (born 1964), American politician
Lora Romero (1960-1997), American assistant professor
Lora Storey (born 1989), Australian middle-distance runner
Lora Webster (born 1986), American Paralympic volleyballist
Lora Yakovleva (born 1932), Russian chess grandmaster

People with the surname Lora
Alan Loras, is a Bolivian footballer. 
Alberto Lora Ramos (born 1987), Spanish football player
Alex Lora (born 1952), Mexican musician and composer
Carmen Josefina Lora Iglesias (1940 – 1999), was a Dominican revolutionary and lawyer.
Enrique Lora (born 1945), Star Spanish Football player for Sevilla FC in the 1970s
Fabiano Bolla Lora (born 1977), a Brazilian former footballer who played as a goalkeeper.
Filippo Lora (born 1993), Italian Football player of Spanish descent playing for Ravenna F.C.
Francisco Augusto Lora, former vice president of the Dominican Republic and presidential candidate
Guillermo Lora (1922-2009), Trotskyist leader in Bolivia
Johan Lora (Born 1982),  Dominican international footballer 
Luis Eduardo Lora (born 1986), Colombian football player.
Mathias Loras (1792-1858), French priest, first Bishop of the Dubuque Diocese
Manny Lora (born 1991), American baseball coach and former pitcher.
Marie Lora-Mungai, French  producer, writer and show runner.
Miguel "Happy" Lora (born 1961), Colombian boxer
Ñico Lora (1880-1971), Dominican, father of Merengue music
Saturnino and Mariano Lora, Cuban brothers, war heroes
Yelitza Lora, Dominican TV & Radio host and actress

Places
Lora (Lydia), a town of ancient Lydia, now in Turkey
Lora, Norway, a village in Lesja municipality in Oppland
Lora, Chile a town on the Mataquito River, Chile
Lora, a frazioni in the municipality of Campegine, Italy
Lora (Split), a neighborhood and naval base in Split, Croatia
Lora, Khyber Pakhtunkhwa, a village and union council in Pakistan
Lora River, Pakistan
Lora de Estepa, a municipality in the province of Seville, Spain
Lora del Río, a municipality in the province of Seville, Spain
Loras College, a four-year Catholic university located in Dubuque, Iowa
Falls of Lora, a tidal race which forms at the mouth of Loch Etive, Scotland
Sargentes de la Lora, a municipality located in the province of Burgos, Castile and León, Spain.

Animals
Lora or Leptophis ahaetulla, a Parrot Snake found in northern South America and Trinidad and Tobago
Grey Lora or Leptophis stimsoni, a small snake which is endemic to Trinidad and Tobago
Lora (genus), a gastropod genus of the Turridae family

Technology
 LORA (missile), a theatre quasiballistic missile produced in Israel
 LORA, an acronym for Level of Repair Analysis
 LoRa, a low power wireless communication technology
 LORA, an acronym for "Logic Of Rational Agents", see BDI Software Agents
 LoRA, an acronym for "Low-Rank Adaptation", a fast way to train Stable Diffusion developed by researchers at Microsoft

Other
Lora, an Ancient Roman term for a wine substitute later known as piquette
 Lora (film), a 2007 Hungarian film

See also

Laura (disambiguation)
Lota (name)

Spanish-language surnames
Surnames of French origin
French nobility